Frank G. Bonelli (October 15, 1906 – February 14, 1972) was the Los Angeles County Supervisor of the 1st District from 1958 to 1972, a member of the California State Assembly for the 52nd district from 1953 to 1958, and a member of the Huntington Park, California City Council from 1946 to 1953.

The Frank G. Bonelli Regional Park is named in his honor.

An archive of his correspondence and scrapbooks from his career is held in the Seaver Center for Western History Research, Natural History Museum of Los Angeles County.

References

External links

1906 births
1972 deaths
California city council members
Los Angeles County Board of Supervisors
Democratic Party members of the California State Assembly
Politicians from Los Angeles
20th-century American politicians